Charaxes analava is a butterfly in the family Nymphalidae. It is found on Madagascar. The habitat consists of Afrotropical forests.

Description

Ch. analava Ward . The marginal band of the hindwing is unicolorous black without spots 
and only reaches vein 4. The hindwing beneath behind the middle with a row of large eye-spots, of which the one in cellule 7 is especially large and distinct. Hindwing with 3 long tails, that at vein 3 somewhat shorter. Ground-colour of both wings light yellow. Madagascar. 

A full description is also given by Rothschild, W and Jordan, K. (1900). Novitates Zoologicae  Volume 7:287-524.  page 362-364 (for terms see Novitates Zoologicae  Volume 5:545-601  )

Taxonomy
Charaxes varanes group. Subgenus Stonehamia (Hadrodontes)

The group members are 
Charaxes varanes
Charaxes fulvescens very similar to varanes
Charaxes acuminatus very pointed forewing
Charaxes balfouri
Charaxes analava
Charaxes nicati
Charaxes bertrami perhaps subspecies of varanes
Charaxes saperanus
Charaxes defulvata

References
Victor Gurney Logan Van Someren (1974). Revisional notes on African Charaxes (Lepidoptera: Nymphalidae). Part IX. Bulletin of the British Museum of Natural History (Entomology) 29(8):415-487. 
 Seitz, A. Die Gross-Schmetterlinge der Erde 13: Die Afrikanischen Tagfalter. Plate XIII 31

External links
Charaxes analava images at Consortium for the Barcode of Life 
African Butterfly Database Range map  via search

Butterflies described in 1872
analava
Endemic fauna of Madagascar
Butterflies of Africa
Taxa named by Christopher Ward (entomologist)